Sukhwinder Singh (born 18 July 1971) is an internationally acclaimed Indian playback singer who primarily sings Bollywood songs. He is famous internationally for singing "Jai Ho" from the film Slumdog Millionaire which won an Academy Award for Best Original Song and a Grammy Award for Best Song Written for a Motion Picture, Television or Other Visual Media.

One of his most famous songs is "Chaiyya Chaiyya" from Mani Ratnam's 1998 film Dil Se.., was composed by A. R. Rahman, written by Gulzar, and sung in duet with Sapna Awasthi.

Early life and career
Sukhwinder Singh hails from hathi gate in bhatti family Amritsar, Punjab. He released a Punjabi album called Munda Southhall Da with T. Singh, joined Laxmikant–Pyarelal’s troupe, and quickly became a music arranger before heading to South India to look for work, wherein, he sang for the Tamil film Ratchagan.

Singh got his first Bollywood break with the song "Aaja Sanam" in the film named Khilaaf. But he realised that something was missing in his voice, so he took a sabbatical and left Mumbai to tour England and America to see, hear, and understand various forms of music. After this broadening of his musical horizons, he returned to Mumbai to kick-start his musical career.

His first effort in Hindi films, Aaja Sanam, went largely unnoticed even though the music carried the names of Laxmikant–Pyarelal. Then for Dil Se.., A. R. Rahman used Sukhwinder for "Chaiyya Chaiyya".

He has been well received for providing playback singing for Bollywood actor Shahrukh Khan in a total of 7 songs. Of these, "Chaiyya Chaiyya" from Dil Se.., "Dard-E-Disco" from Om Shanti Om, "Chak De India" from Chak De! India, "Haule Haule" from Rab Ne Bana Di Jodi, "Marjaani" from Billu, "Satakali" from Happy New Year, and "Udi Udi Jaye" from Raees have become certified hits.

In June 2014, he participated in the seventh season of Jhalak Dikhhla Jaa. Sukhwinder has his brothers also Shanker Bhatti, Rinkuu Bhatti and two more. He sung the 2023 Men's FIH Hockey World Cup anthem, Jai Ho Hindustan Ki composed by Prem Anand.

Awards
Sukhwinder Singh won the Filmfare Best Male Playback Award for songs "Chaiyya Chaiyya" from the movie Dil Se.. and for the song "Haule Haule" from the movie Rab Ne Bana Di Jodi

Sukhwinder Singh's song "Jai Ho", won him international acclaim when it won the Academy Award for Best Original Song. The same song also won the Grammy Award for Best Song Written for a Motion Picture, Television or Other Visual Media in 2010.

He has been awarded the National Film Award for Best Male Playback Singer at the 62nd National Film Awards for his rendition in the 2014 film Haider composed by Vishal Bhardwaj.

Discography

Studio albums
Nasha Hi Nasha Hai (2000)
Jashn (2001)

As playback singer

Hindi songs

Telugu songs

Kannada songs

Tamil songs

Marathi songs

Urdu songs

Collaboration with musician and lyricist

References

External links
 
 
 
 

1971 births
Living people
Bollywood playback singers
Indian male playback singers
21st-century Indian singers
Tamil playback singers
Kannada playback singers
Indian Sikhs
Indian film score composers
Indian male film score composers
21st-century Indian male singers
ZYX Music artists
Best Male Playback Singer National Film Award winners
Filmfare Awards winners
Screen Awards winners
Zee Cine Awards winners